Gimillan is a frazione in the Aosta Valley region of Italy. It is located about 3 km from Cogne, the capoluogo, on a side hill of the valley.

Saint Pantaleon is the patron of the town.

Gallery 

Frazioni of Aosta Valley
Cogne